Haydari is a type of yogurt dish similar to a thick cacık, made from certain herbs and spices, combined with garlic and yogurt. It differs from cacık in that the recipe contains no cucumber and calls for strained yogurt or labne. It is served purely as a meze, being more pungently appetizing - by virtue of being saltier, more acidic and of a thicker consistency -  than cacık.

See also
 List of dips
 List of hors d'oeuvre
 List of yogurt-based dishes and beverages
 List of dairy products
 Milk salad
 Tarator
 Qatiq
 Raita
 Cold borscht

References

Turkish cuisine